Richard Wilson Folkins (1917-1987), was a United States international lawn bowler.

Bowls career
He won a gold medal in the triples with Bill Miller and Clive Forrester at the 1972 World Outdoor Bowls Championship in Worthing. He also won a bronze medal in the team event (Leonard Trophy).

Folkins won a silver medal in the 1976 World Outdoor Championships in Johannesburg with his bowls partner Neil McInnes.

In addition he won fourteen US Open titles.

Personal life
He was a highway planning engineer by trade. He died in 1987. He was married to fellow international bowler Corinna Folkins.

References

1917 births
1987 deaths
American male bowls players
Bowls World Champions